Hypopterygium tamarisci is a species of moss in the family Hypopterygiaceae.

References

Flora of New South Wales
Bryopsida